When used as a nickname, Dutch may refer to:

In arts and entertainment 
 Kenny Howard (1929–1992), American artist
 Elmore Leonard (1925–2013), American novelist and screenwriter 
 Dutch Mason (1908–2006), Canadian blues musician

Politicians 
 L. E. Katterfeld (1881–1974), American socialist politician
 Ronald Reagan (1911–2004), 40th President of the United States
 Dutch Ruppersberger (born 1946), U.S. congressman from Maryland

Soldiers 
 Norman Cota (1893–1971), US Army major general in World War II
 Petrus Hugo (1917–1986), South African Second World War flying ace

In sports

American football 
 Dutch Clark (1906–1978), National Football League player and coach
 Gustave Ferbert (1873–1943), football player and later head coach at the University of Michigan
 Dutch Meyer (1898–1982), American collegiate football coach
 Dennis K. Stanley (1906–1983), American college professor and sports coach

Baseball 
 Darren Daulton (1962–2017), Major League Baseball analyst; former player
 Mort Flohr (1911–1994), American Major League Baseball pitcher in 1934
 Troy Herriage (1930–2012), American Major League Baseball pitcher in 1956
 Dutch Holland (1903–1967), Major League Baseball outfielder
 Dutch Leonard (left-handed pitcher) (1892–1952), Major League Baseball pitcher
 Dutch Leonard (right-handed pitcher) (1909–1983), Major League Baseball pitcher
 Dutch McCall (1920–1996), Major League Baseball pitcher
 Dutch Zwilling (1888–1978), Major League Baseball player

Other sports 
 Jim Cain (ice hockey) (1902–1962), Canadian National Hockey League player
 Dutch Lonborg (1898–1985), American collegiate basketball and football coach
 Alf Skinner (1894–1961), Canadian National Hockey League player
 Cornelius Warmerdam (1915–2001), American pole vaulter

Other vocations 
 Darren Dutchyshen (born 1966), Canadian sportscaster
 Dutch Boyd (born 1980), American professional poker player
 James H. Kindelberger (1895–1962), American aviation pioneer
 Dutch Schultz (1901–1935), American gangster
 Joseph Paul Cretzer (1911-1946), American criminal and Alcatraz inmate
 A. P. Hamann, City Manager of San Jose, California

See also 
 
 
 Dutchy (disambiguation)
 Dutchman (disambiguation)

Lists of people by nickname